Walter Minogue (6 April 1910 – 6 October 1958) was an Australian rules footballer who played with Footscray in the Victorian Football League (VFL).

Notes

External links 
		

1910 births
1958 deaths
Australian rules footballers from New South Wales
Western Bulldogs players
South Broken Hill Football Club players